Brown Creek (also known as Brown's Creek)  is a tributary of the Susquehanna River in Luzerne County, Pennsylvania, in the United States. It is designated as a Coldwater Fishery and a Migratory Fishery. The creek has two dams on it: the Brown Creek Dam and the Brown Creek Debris Dam. It is crossed by a number of bridges.

Course
Brown Creek begins in a valley on a mountain, once known as Pine Swamp, in the northwestern part of Larksville. It flows south-southwest for a few tenths of a mile before turning southeast for several tenths of a mile, passing through the community of Gregory and exiting its valley. The creek then turns south-southeast for a few tenths of a mile before turning southeast and then south-southwest, entering Plymouth after several tenths of a mile. In Plymouth, it turns east for a short distance before turning south, crossing US Route 11 and reaching its confluence with the Susquehanna River.

Brown Creek joins the Susquehanna River  upriver of its mouth.

Hydrology, geography and geology

The discharge of Brown Creek was measured three times in 1956. On November 6, 1956, it was measured to be 0.14 cubic feet per second. On June 30, 1956, it was measured to be 0.20 cubic feet per second and on September 21, 1956, it was measured to be 0.37 cubic feet per second. Brown Creek is typically dry. However, it can experience short, intense floods on occasion. Near the debris dam on the creek, most of its flow is diverted through a 10-foot (3-meter) wide pressure conduit that carries water through a nearby levee. The remaining flow continues through the channel of Brown Creek in both open channels and culverts, running under roads and buildings.

Watershed
The creek's mouth is in the United States Geological Survey quadrangle of Wilkes-Barre West. However, its source is in the quadrangle of Kingston.

Brown Creek is dammed by a dam known as the Brown Creek Dam, which is located on Cherry Street in the borough of Plymouth. Its reservoir is dry in typical conditions. As of 1980, the dam was in "fair" condition, although it is experiencing some erosion. It is classified as a "high hazard-small dam". Mine subsidence affects the dam, but a plan to fix this is considered to be low-priority. A pumping station also operates on the creek. There is also a debris dam on the creek near Edwards Street.

History
Brown Creek, usually called Brown's Creek, has been known by many other names historically, including: Nesbitt's Creek, Cooper's Run, Poke Hollow Creek, Bull Run Creek and Pine Swamp Creek.

A concrete culvert bridge carrying Carver Street was constructed over Brown Creek in 1951. Another concrete culvert bridge, this one carrying State Route 1001, was built over the creek in 1953. It underwent replacement in 2014 for a cost of $443,000.

An earth-fill dam and a debris dam were constructed on Brown Creek in 1959 for a cost of $492,000. A pressure conduit on Brown Creek failed during Tropical Storm Lee.

Brown Creek was entered into the Geographic Names Information System on August 2, 1979. Its identifier in the Geographic Names Information System is 1170364.

Biology
The entire drainage basin of Brown Creek is designated as a Coldwater Fishery and a Migratory Fishery.

See also
Wadham Creek, next tributary on the west side of the Susquehanna River going downriver
Shupp's Creek, next tributary on the west side of the Susquehanna River, going upriver.
Toby Creek, next tributary (after Shupp's Creek) on the west side of the Susquehanna River going upriver.
List of rivers of Pennsylvania

References

External links
Google Street View image of Brown Creek

Rivers of Luzerne County, Pennsylvania
Tributaries of the Susquehanna River
Rivers of Pennsylvania